USS Scamp has been the name of more than one United States Navy ship, and may refer to:

 , a submarine commissioned in 1942 and reported missing in 1944
 , a submarine in commission from 1961 to 1988

United States Navy ship names